= National Oceanic and Atmospheric Administration Climate and Societal Interactions Program =

The United States National Oceanic and Atmospheric Administration Climate and Societal Interactions Program (abbreviated as NOAA CSI), formerly the Climate Assessment and Services Division of CPO supports the NOAA Climate Service.

The goals of the CSI program are: public relations regarding water resources in coastal zones, research and development for coastal regions, and inter-agency communication.
